Tel Aviv on Fire (Hebrew: תל אביב על האש, Tel Aviv Al Ha'Esh) is a 2018 internationally co-produced comedy-drama satire film directed by Sameh Zoabi and co-written by Zoabi and Dan Kleinman. The film premiered internationally at the 75th Venice International Film Festival in the Orizzonti section, where Kais Nashef won the Best Actor award. The Israeli premiere was at the Haifa International Film Festival, where the film won the Best Film and Best Screenplay awards. It was selected as the Luxembourgish entry for the Best International Feature Film at the 92nd Academy Awards, but it was not nominated.

Plot 
Salem (Kais Nashef), a Palestinian from East Jerusalem, is a low-level production assistant on the soap opera Tel Aviv on Fire in Ramallah. The show, which is popular with both Palestinians and Israelis, tells the story of a Palestinian spy who falls in love with an IDF officer. Asi (Yaniv Biton), who staffs the checkpoint Salem must pass through every day to get to work, tells Salem that the show's military dialogue is unrealistic, and writes his own script. Salem uses Asi's dialogue in the show, which impresses the producers and the star, Tala (Lubna Azabal), and leads to Salem being suddenly promoted to fulltime screenwriter. There's only one problem: Salem can't write screenplays and must quickly learn.

To avoid getting fired, Salem makes a deal with Asi, who helps him write in exchange for fine Palestinian hummus, and a promise that the series' plot will end with a wedding. Salem convinces the producers to conclude the show's season with a wedding, but the Palestinian investors demand that the spy sets off a bomb at the wedding, killing herself, the IDF officer, and his comrades.

Salem gets himself out of this bind by having Asi appear in the show as a character who breaks up the wedding before the bomb is detonated. This enables Tel Aviv on Fire to have a second season and Salem to remain employed. His continuing employment also resolves a secondary plotline where he is trying to win back his girlfriend, Maryam (Maisa Abd Alhady), who accuses him of being unreliable and unable to keep a job.

Cast

Reception

Box office 
Tel Aviv on Fire grossed $0.5 million in North America and $1.2 million in other territories, for a worldwide total of $1.7 million.

Critical response 
The website's critical consensus reads, "Thoughtful and well-acted, Tel Aviv on Fire highlights the awful absurdity of war -- and proves it's possible to find humor in the midst of cultural conflict." On Metacritic, the film has a normalized score of 70 out of 100, based on 16 critics, indicating "generally favorable reviews".

Awards

Production 
The film is a Luxembourg-Israel-France-Belgium co-production, and received funding from the Luxembourg Film Fund, the Israel Film Fund, YES Israeli Films, Gesher Multicultural Film Fund and Mifal Hapais.

See also
 List of submissions to the 92nd Academy Awards for Best International Feature Film
 List of Luxembourgish submissions for the Academy Award for Best International Feature Film

References

External links 
 
 
 

Israeli satirical films
Israeli–Palestinian conflict films
2010s Arabic-language films
2010s Hebrew-language films
Israeli comedy-drama films
2018 comedy-drama films
2018 films
Luxembourgian comedy-drama films
2010s satirical films
2018 multilingual films
Israeli multilingual films
Luxembourgian multilingual films